The canton of Adour Armagnac is an administrative division of the Landes department, southwestern France. It was created at the French canton reorganisation which came into effect in March 2015. Its seat is in Aire-sur-l'Adour.

Composition 

It consists of the following communes:

Aire-sur-l'Adour
Artassenx
Arthez-d'Armagnac
Bahus-Soubiran
Bascons
Bordères-et-Lamensans
Bourdalat
Buanes
Castandet
Cazères-sur-l'Adour
Classun
Duhort-Bachen
Eugénie-les-Bains
Le Frêche
Grenade-sur-l'Adour
Hontanx
Lacquy
Larrivière-Saint-Savin
Latrille
Lussagnet
Maurrin
Montégut
Perquie
Pujo-le-Plan
Renung
Saint-Agnet
Saint-Cricq-Villeneuve
Sainte-Foy
Saint-Gein
Saint-Loubouer
Saint-Maurice-sur-Adour
Sarron
Vielle-Tursan
Le Vignau
Villeneuve-de-Marsan

Councillors

Pictures of the canton

References 

Cantons of Landes (department)